Television rights to all Edmonton Oilers games are held by Rogers Media. This includes all regional telecasts, which are carried by Sportsnet West and the overflow channel Sportsnet Oilers, as well as nationally televised games on Sportsnet or Hockey Night in Canada—which may either be broadcast by CBC Television, Citytv, or Sportsnet. The team's broadcast region is shared with the Calgary Flames, and includes all of Alberta, Saskatchewan, Northwest Territories and Nunavut. Most Oilers games are commentated by Jack Michaels and Louie DeBrusk, joined by reporter Gene Principe.

Television
The TV crews were as follows (where more than one analyst appears for a season, each worked a number of games).

Pay-Per-View Television
The Pay-Per-View TV crews were as follows (where more than one analyst appears for a season, each worked a number of games).

Notes
Bruce Buchanan was the play-by-play announcer for the Edmonton Oilers television broadcasts on ITV, CKEM, and Sportsnet West from 1984 until 2001.
Morley Scott did colour on home games in 1993-94 and 1997–08; others in that role were Ken Brown (1979–85, 1988–90), Gord Garbutt (1985-86, 1991–94, 1995-96), Jim Matheson (1986–88, 1995–96) and Dave Semenko (1994–95). Bob Stouffer did colour commentary beginning in 2008–09. Kevin Karius substituted for Scott when Scott doing games broadcast on pay-per-view beginning in 2005. Colour commentators did not go on the road until at least 1995-96.
On September 2, 2008, Louie DeBrusk was announced as the new colour commentator for Rogers Sportsnet Edmonton Oilers television broadcasts. DeBrusk replaced former colour commentator Ray Ferraro. He was replaced by Drew Remenda. in 2014 but continues to appear as an analyst.

See also
Historical NHL over-the-air television broadcasters

References

External links
Sportsnet releases 2019-20 Edmonton Oilers broadcast schedule
Oilers Radio Network
Sportsnet to Broadcast All 82 Edmonton Oilers - NHL.com

Edmonton Oilers announcers
Edmonton Oilers lists
Lists of National Hockey League broadcasters
Sportsnet